The 1977 U.S. Pro Indoor was a men's tennis tournament played on indoor carpet courts that was part of the World Championship Tennis (WCT) circuit. It was played at the Spectrum in Philadelphia, Pennsylvania in the United States. It was the 10th edition of the tournament and was held from January 24 through January 30, 1977. Dick Stockton, who was seeded 12th, won the singles title while Bob Hewitt and Frew McMillan won the men's doubles. Total attendance for the tournament was 81,798.

Finals

Singles

 Dick Stockton defeated  Jimmy Connors 3–6, 6–4, 3–6, 6–1, 6–2 
 It was Stockton's 1st title for that year  and the 13th of his career.

Doubles

 Bob Hewitt /  Frew McMillan defeated  Wojciech Fibak /  Tom Okker 6–1, 1–6, 6–3 

It was Hewitt's 1st title for that year and the 31st of his career. It was McMillan's 1st title of the year and the 36th of his career.

References

External links
 ITF tournament edition details

U.S. Pro Indoor
U.S. Pro Indoor
U.S. Professional Indoor
U.S. Professional Indoor
U.S. Professional Indoor